Denzer is an unincorporated community in the town of Honey Creek, Sauk County, Wisconsin, United States.

History
The community was named for Heinrich W. Denzer, who had donated land for a church and a school.

References

Unincorporated communities in Sauk County, Wisconsin
Unincorporated communities in Wisconsin